Harald Netzbandt (3 August 1892 in Berlin – died 27 May 1941 in the North Atlantic) was an officer of the Imperial German Navy, the Reichsmarine and later the Kriegsmarine.

Promoted to Kapitän zur See from 1 October 1937 he was in command of the fleet flagship, the battleship Gneisenau, from 26 November 1939 to 1 August 1940. Subsequently, he was appointed chief of staff in the fleet command and was killed on 27 May 1941, aboard the new battleship Bismarck alongside Fleet Admiral Günther Lütjens and other staff officers.

Awards
German Cross in Gold on 30 April 1942 as Kapitän zur See with the OKM/Flottenkommando

References

Bibliography

 

1892 births
1941 deaths
Military personnel from Berlin
Imperial German Navy personnel of World War I
Reichsmarine personnel
Kriegsmarine personnel killed in World War II
Recipients of the Gold German Cross